Gachi may refer to:

Gachi, Fars
Gachi, Mamasani, Fars Province
Gachi, Isfahan
Gachi, Nain, Isfahan Province
Gachi, Kohgiluyeh and Boyer-Ahmad
Gachi, Lorestan
Gachi, Sistan and Baluchestan
Gachi, West Azerbaijan
Gachi District, in Ilam Province
Gachi Rural District, in Ilam Province

See also
Gachimuchi